The 2014 Korea Grand Prix was the sixteenth badminton tournament of the 2014 BWF Grand Prix Gold and Grand Prix. The tournament was held in Jeonju Indoor Badminton Court, Jeonju, South Korea from 4 until 9 November 2014 and had a total purse of $50,000. This tournament hosted by the Badminton Korea Association, and organized by Jeonbuk National Badminton Association, with the sanctioned from the BWF. The sponsor of this tournament was the Jeollabuk-do, Jeonju city; Ministry of Culture, Sports and Tourism; Korea Sports Council; and the Korea Sports Promotion Foundation. At the end of the tournament, the host country won four from five titles, and also made a record to win the three consecutive doubles events (men's, women's, and mixed) for the eighth consecutive time. The women's singles title goes to Japanese player.

Men's singles

Seeds

  Lee Dong-keun (champion)
  Daren Liew (first round)
  Riichi Takeshita (third round)
  Mohamad Arif Abdul Latif (third round)
  Lee Hyun-il (finals)
  Wang Tzu-wei (third round)
  Kazumasa Sakai (semifinals)
  Iskandar Zulkarnain Zainuddin (quarterfinals)
 Shih Kuei-chun (third round)
 Goh Soon Huat (third round)
 Wan Chia-hsin (third round)
 Fikri Ihsandi Hadmadi (second round)
 Tan Kian Meng (quarterfinals)
 Kenta Nishimoto (third round)
 Ai Wei Jian (first round)
 Park Sung-min (first round)

Finals

Women's singles

Seeds

  Pai Hsiao-ma (first round)
  Tee Jing Yi (first round)
  Maria Febe Kusumastuti (first round)
  Kaori Imabeppu (quarterfinals)
  Kana Ito (semifinals)
  Nozomi Okuhara (champion)
  Sayaka Sato (finals)
  Yang Li Lian (second round)

Finals

Men's doubles

Seeds

 Lee Yong-dae / Yoo Yeon-seong (champion)
 Ko Sung-hyun / Shin Baek-choel (finals)
 Liao Min-chun / Tseng Min-hao (first round)
 Hiroyuki Saeki / Ryota Taohata (semifinals)
 Kenta Kazuno / Kazushi Yamada (first round)
 Choi Sol-kyu / Kang Ji-wook (quarterfinals)
 Kim Dae-sun / Kim Duck-young (first round)
 Takuto Inoue / Yuki Kaneko (quarterfinals)

Finals

Women's doubles

Seeds

 Lee So-hee / Shin Seung-chan (champion)
 Suci Rizky Andini / Tiara Rosalia Nuraidah (first round)
 Amelia Alicia Anscelly / Soong Fie Cho (first round)
 Yuki Fukushima / Sayaka Hirota (quarterfinals)
 Chang Ye-na / Yoo Hae-won (finals)
 Go Ah-ra / Kim So-yeong (semifinals)
 Choi Hye-in / Kim Ha-na (first round)
 Eom Hye-won / Jung Kyung-eun (quarterfinals)

Finals

Mixed doubles

Seeds

 Ko Sung-hyun / Kim Ha-na (first round)
 Tan Aik Quan / Lai Pei Jing (second round)
 Liao Min-chun / Chen Hsiao-huan (second round)
 Wong Fai Yin / Chow Mei Kuan (quarterfinals)
 Shin Baek-choel / Chang Ye-na (finals)
 Choi Sol-gyu / Shin Seung-chan (champion)
 Chan Peng Soon / Ng Hui Lin (second round)
 Ong Jian Guo / Lee Meng Yean (withdrew)

Finals

References

External links
 Badminton Korea Association 
 Tournament draw at tournamentsoftware.com

Korea Masters
Korea
Korea Grand Prix
Sports competitions in Jeonju
Korea Grand Prix
Korea OGrand Prix